Sir Arthur Osmond Wynn Williams JP DL (17 March 1849 – 28 January 1927) was a Welsh Liberal Party politician.

Early life

He was born at Llanfihangel-y-Traethau, Merionethshire, Wales on 17 March 1849.  He was the eldest surviving son of Anne Louisa (née Loveday) Williams and David Williams, M.P. for Merioneth from 1868 to 1869. Among his siblings was brother Dr. Leonard Williams, the prominent physician and writer, and sister Alice Williams, the painter and welfare worker.

Williams was educated at Eton.

Career 
He was elected as Liberal M.P. for Merioneth at the 1900 general election and held the seat until 1910.

Williams served as Justice of the Peace and Deputy Lieutenant for Caernarvonshire, Chairman of Quarter Sessions for Merioneth, and constable of Harlech Castle. In 1909, he was created a baronet of Castell Deudraeth and Borthwen, and from 22 March 1909 to 28 January 1927, he served as Lord Lieutenant of Merionethshire.

Personal life
On 3 August 1880, he married Frances Evelyn Greaves (1855–1926) in Lillington, Warwickshire. She was a daughter of John Whitehead Greaves and Ellen (née Stedman) Greaves. Together, they were the parents of six children, including:

 David Osmond Deudraeth Williams (1882–1882), who died in infancy.
 Capt Osmond Trahairn Deudraeth Williams (1883–1915), who married Lady Gladys Margaret Finch-Hatton (1882–1964), the only daughter of Henry Finch-Hatton, 13th Earl of Winchilsea and Annie Jane Codrington (eldest daughter of Admiral of the Fleet Sir Henry Codrington). He served in the South African War and was killed in action in the Great War during the Battle of Loos.
 Evelyn Oliven Williams (1884–1960), who married Maj. Gen. Sir Nevill Smyth.
 Lawrence Trevor Greaves Williams (1885–1930), who died unmarried.
 Annie Salizma Loveday Williams (b. 1891)
 Ellen Dolga Dormie Williams (b. 1891), who married Capt. Robert Gordon Beazley, brother of Hugh Loveday Beazley. 

Lady Williams died on 10 August 1926.  Sir Osmond died in Australia on 28 January 1927.  He was succeeded in the baronetcy by his grandson, Michael Osmond Williams, 2nd Baronet (1914–2012), who married Benitha Mary Booker, daughter of George Henry Booker.

References

External links 
 
 Family tree information
 Sir (Arthur) Osmond Williams, 1st Bt (1849-1927), Landowner and politician at the National Portrait Gallery, London.

1849 births
1927 deaths
Knights Bachelor
Liberal Party (UK) MPs for Welsh constituencies
Deputy Lieutenants of Caernarvonshire
Lord-Lieutenants of Merionethshire
Baronets in the Baronetage of the United Kingdom
UK MPs 1900–1906
UK MPs 1906–1910
Welsh justices of the peace